Secret Service Investigator is a 1948 American crime film directed by R. G. Springsteen and written by John K. Butler. The film stars Lynne Roberts, Lloyd Bridges, George Zucco, June Storey, Trevor Bardette and John Kellogg. The film was released on May 31, 1948 by Republic Pictures.

Plot

Cast    
Lynne Roberts as Susan Lane
Lloyd Bridges as Steve Mallory / Dan Redfern
George Zucco as Otto Dagoff
June Storey as Laura Deering Redfern
Trevor Bardette as Henry Witzel
John Kellogg as Benny Deering
Jack Overman as Herman
Roy Barcroft as Al Turk 
Douglas Evans as Secret Service Inspector Crehan
Milton Parsons as Miller
James Flavin as Police Inspector Thorndyke
William "Billy" Benedict as Counterman
Minerva Urecal as Mrs. McGiven
Tommy Ivo as Teddy Lane
Sam McDaniel as Porter

References

External links 
 

1948 films
American crime films
1948 crime films
Republic Pictures films
Films directed by R. G. Springsteen
American black-and-white films
1940s English-language films
1940s American films